Kanaga Volcano, or Mount Kanaga, is a stratovolcano at the northern tip of Kanaga Island in the Aleutian Islands, Alaska.  It is situated within a caldera, which forms the arcuate Kanaton Ridge south and east of Kanaga.  A crater lake occupies part of the SE caldera floor. The summit of Kanaga has a crater with fumarolic activity.

It is located about 25 km (16 mi) west of the U.S. Navy installation and port on Adak Island. The volcano erupted intermittently through much of 1994, dusting the community of Adak at least once with fine ash.

References

 
 Volcanoes of the Alaska Peninsula and Aleutian Islands-Selected Photographs
 Alaska Volcano Observatory

Gallery

See also
 List of volcanoes in the United States of America
 Alaska Volcano Observatory

Landforms of Aleutians West Census Area, Alaska
Stratovolcanoes of the United States
Active volcanoes
Mountains of Alaska
Volcanoes of Alaska
Volcanic crater lakes
Aleutian Range
Calderas of Alaska
Mountains of Unorganized Borough, Alaska
Volcanoes of Unorganized Borough, Alaska